Vladimir Alexandrovich Chebaturkin (born April 23, 1975 in Tyumen, Soviet Union) is a professional ice hockey player who played in the National Hockey League for the New York Islanders, St. Louis Blues and the Chicago Blackhawks. He was drafted 66th overall by the Islanders in the 1993 NHL Entry Draft and went on to play 62 games, scoring 2 goals and 7 assists for 9 points and collecting 52 penalty minutes.

After retiring as a player, Chebaturkin served as an assistant coach for Kontinental Hockey League's Atlant Mytishchi, Avangard Omsk and HC CSKA Moscow. He is currently head coach of Zvezda Moscow of the Supreme Hockey League.

Career statistics

Regular season and playoffs

International

External links
 

1975 births
Ak Bars Kazan players
Amur Khabarovsk players
Chicago Blackhawks players
Hartford Wolf Pack players
HC Neftekhimik Nizhnekamsk players
Kentucky Thoroughblades players
Living people
Lowell Lock Monsters players
New York Islanders draft picks
New York Islanders players
Norfolk Admirals players
People from Tyumen
Russian ice hockey defencemen
St. Louis Blues players
Utah Grizzlies (IHL) players
Worcester IceCats players
Sportspeople from Tyumen Oblast